Marguerite de La Rocque de Roberval (fl 1515–1542) was a French noblewoman who spent some years marooned on the Île des Démons while on her way to New France (Quebec).  She became well known after her subsequent rescue and return to France; her story was recounted in the Heptaméron by Queen Marguerite of Navarre, and in later histories by François de Belleforest and André Thévet. Her story has been retold many times since 1560.

Early life
Marguerite de La Rocque's place and date of birth are unknown, but records attest to her declaration of fealty and homage in 1536 for her lands in Périgord and Languedoc.  She was co-seigneuress of Pontpoint, with relative Jean-François de La Rocque de Roberval, a nobleman privateer favoured by Francis I of France.  (The exact relationship remains unclear. André Thevet claimed Roberval was her uncle, while François de Belleforest indicated they were brother and sister.  Historian Elizabeth Boyer suggests they were in fact cousins.)

Voyage and marooning
The Isle of Demons is reputedly off the east coast of Quebec, in an area known as the Lower North Shore. Local folklore indicates that the Island is now known as Harrington Harbour. This is detailed in the work of Elizabeth Boyer.
In 1541 Roberval was made Lieutenant General of New France, and the following year set out for the New World, accompanied by Marguerite, who was still young and unmarried. During the journey, she became the lover of a young man. Displeased with his young relative's actions, Roberval left Marguerite on the "Isle of Demons", While possibly motivated by his strong Calvinist morals, it is likely he was also driven by financial greed, since his debts were high, and Marguerite's death would be to his benefit. Also marooned were Marguerite's lover, and her maidservant Damienne. In the Heptaméron, the Queen of Navarre claims the lover was set down first, with Marguerite opting to join him; Thevet claims the young man swam to join Marguerite.

Marguerite's lover is intentionally unidentified in early histories; while presented in the Queen of Navarre's work as an unskilled labourer, this was, in part, to hide his identity, preserving the reputation of his aristocratic family.

While it is unlikely she was pregnant when first abandoned, Marguerite gave birth to a child while on the island. The baby died, as did the young man and the maidservant. It is possible the baby died due to insufficient milk, Marguerite's diet being poor. Marguerite survived by hunting wild animals, and was rescued by Basque fishermen some years later.

The "Island of Demons" (or spirits) is part of a group later known as the Isles de la Demoiselle, presumably after her (French demoiselle means "young lady"); specifically, the island is believed to be the one now known as Caribou Island, off of Saint Paul's River.

Later life
Returning to France after her rescue, Marguerite achieved some celebrity when her story became known. She became a schoolmistress, and settled in Nontron, living in Chateau de La Mothe. There is no record of any action or charges brought by her against Roberval.  Her death date and place is unrecorded. (Roberval died in 1560.)

Literary representations
Marguerite's story was first recorded by Marguerite de Navarre, sister of the king of France, in her work Heptaméron (published posthumously in 1558), in François de Belleforest's Histoires tragiques (5th volume, 1570) and André Thévet's Cosmographie (1575).  The Queen of Navarre's account of Marguerite's adventures was a romantic tale, based on information provided by "Captain Roberval"; Thevet, who claimed he was told the story by the cast-away herself, offered more precise details, describing the journey, the colonists on board the ships, and the location of the Île des Démons.  Text comparisons show that Thevet was, at least, familiar with the Queen's and de Belleforest's earlier accounts.

In addition to her early chroniclers, Marguerite de la Rocque's story has provided inspiration for several modern writers. One of the first was Irish-born, Montreal-based George Martin, who in 1887 published a long narrative poem entitled "The Legend of Marguerite". (Martin is now little-known, but he was apparently a friend of Charles Heavysege, and was mentioned by David James O'Donoghue as "one of the leading poets of Canada".). In 1949, Dinah Silveira de Queiroz published Margarida La Rocque: a ilha do demônios, inspired by Thevet's Cosmography; the Brazilian novel was translated into Spanish and French. In 1960, George Woodcock composed a verse play for CBC Radio entitled The Island of Demons. 

In 1975, historian Elizabeth Boyer wrote the novel Marguerite de la Roque: A Story of Survival; and in 1983, A Colony of One: The History of a Brave Woman. In 1995, Donald Wilson Stanley Ryan republished George Martin's The Legend of Marguerite, over a century  after its appearance, adding an explanatory introduction for the Breakwater Books edition. Charles Goulet's novel was entitled The Isle of Demons (2000), and Joan Elizabeth Goodman wrote a novel for young adults in 2002, entitled Paradise. In 2003, Douglas Glover published Elle: A Novel, which won that year's Governor's General book prize. Robert Chafe wrote a bilingual play Isle of Demons, first produced in 2004. Canadian poet bpNichol depicted her in his poem "lament". The British writer Sara Maitland discusses the story in A Book of Silence (2008) and in a short story, "The Tale of the Valiant Demoiselle," in Far North and Other Dark Tales (2008). (Maitland, one of the few non-Canadians to take up the tale, also mentions a 1916 narrative poem by Isabel Mackay). Also in 2008, Annamarie Beckel wrote Silence of Stone (Breakwater Books), a novel which switches between Marguerite on the island and Marguerite as headmistress. In 2016, Theatre Passe Muraille produced a play called Elle (She), an adaptation by Severn Thompson of Glover's novel.

In popular media
The story of Marguerite's marooning on the Isle of Demons was the subject of an episode of Pierre Berton's "Heritage Theatre" television series broadcast on CBC in 1986/1987. Marguerite was played by Terri Hawkes and the series was written by Lister Sinclair and directed by Nigel Napier-Andrews. 
Claims that Marguerite and her lover's ghosts still haunt Quirpon Island was featured in an episode of Creepy Canada.
 The Once 2009 "Marguerite", performed at the Ship Pub, St John's, NL.
 Aengus Finnan 1999 "The Ballad of Marguerite de la Roche", from the album 'Fool's Gold'.

Notes

References
 Leslie, Edward E.; Seagrave, Sterling; (1998) Desperate Journeys, Abandoned Souls: True Stories of Castaways and Other Survivors, Houghton Mifflin Books, excerpts available online
Schlesinger, Roger; Stabler, Arthur Phillips; Thevet, Andre; (1986)  André Thevet's North America: a sixteenth-century view, McGill-Queen's Press, excerpts available online

Further reading
 
 Stabler, Arthur P. The Legend of Marguerite de Roberval 1972.

External links 
 Biography at the Dictionary of Canadian Biography Online
 Poem by Isabel Ecclestone Mackay entitled "Marguerite De Roberval"

Castaways
People of New France
French exiles
15th-century French people
15th-century French women
16th-century French people
16th-century French women